The Gesta Francorum (Deeds of the Franks), or Gesta Francorum et aliorum Hierosolimitanorum (Deeds of the Franks and the other pilgrims to Jerusalem), is a Latin chronicle of the First Crusade  by an anonymous author connected with Bohemond of Taranto.

It narrates the events of the First Crusade from the Council of Clermont in 1095 to the Battle of Ascalon in August 1099. The name of the author is unknown, but he was a member of the crusading party, either Norman or Italian, recruited by Bohemond in 1096 from the duchy of Apulia. His narrative of the trip to Jerusalem, initially under the leadership of Bohemond and then Raymond of Toulouse, was composed and written during the journey. He had the help of a scribe who made occasional edits of his own, and thus the chronicle provides invaluable viewpoints of a knight who was not a high level leader or cleric.

The most important historical contribution is the day-to-day events of the journey: tactical operations, provisioning, changing moods of the crusaders, the anti-Greek prejudice, and progress of each day.

To his literary contemporaries, the anonymous author was a "rustic". Guibert of Nogent wrote his Dei gesta per Francos (1108) based on it, saying the original "frequently left the reader stunned with its insipid vacuity". Robert the Monk was later commissioned to re-write the entire work as Historia Hierosolymitana for literary and historical improvements.  It was later rewritten by Baudri of Dol and in the Historia Belli Sacri. However the original has persisted and today it remains one of the most valuable contemporary sources of the First Crusade.

Steven Runciman writes of the Gesta:
 The author was a simple soldier, honest according to his lights but credulous and prejudiced and a strong admirer of Bohemond .... who hawked it round Northern France during his visit there in 1106. .... it was republished by Tudebod .... and about 1130 in the Historia Belli Sacri, a clumsy compilation [using other sources, e.g., Radulph of Caen.] .... The Gesta was several times rewritten; in about 1109 by Guibert of Nogent, who added personal information and borrowed from Fulcher and who aimed at a more critical and moral tone; in about 1110 by Baudri of Bourgueil, Archbishop of Dol, who sought to improve its literary style; and by Robert of Rheims, whose popular and somewhat romantic version, the Historia Hierosolymitana, appeared in about 1122. It also inspired a short anonymous Expedition contra Turcos, and the chapters on the Crusades in the chronicles of Hugh of Fleury and Henry of Huntington.

Relationship with Peter Tudebode's Account of the First Crusade
The Gesta Francorum closely parallels the account of the First Crusade by the priest and crusader Peter Tudebode, Historia de Hierosolymitano itinere. Both chronicles have highly similar details and phrasing, but each account also contains minor details not found in the other. Historians and paleographers dispute the relationship between the chronicles and the order in which they appeared.  Historian Jay Rubenstein has suggested that the texts share a fuller, common source which has since been lost. This is disputed by Marcus Bull who claims that the Gesta is indeed “the earliest surviving narrative telling the course of the First Crusade.”

Readings of Gesta Francorum

References

Louis Bréhier (ed. and trans.), Gesta Francorum et aliorum Hierosolimitanorum, 1964. French translation.
Gesta Francorum et aliorum Hierosolimitanorum, edited and translated by Rosalind Hill, Oxford, 1967. Latin text with facing-page English translation.

External links
Selections from the Gesta Francorum
The complete text in Latin
1890 critical edition by Heinrich Hagenmeyer (at the Internet Archive)

First Crusade
12th-century Latin books
Crusade chronicles